Five Minutes Too Late (German: Fünf Minuten zu spät) is a 1918 German silent thriller film directed by Uwe Jens Krafft and starring Mia May, Johannes Riemann and Bruno Kastner.

Cast
 Mia May as Jana Vermöhlen 
 Johannes Riemann as Reinhold 
 Bruno Kastner
 Grete Diercks
 Hermann Picha
 Frau Pütz

References

Bibliography
 Alfred Krautz. International directory of cinematographers, set- and costume designers in film, Volume 4. Saur, 1984.

External links

1918 films
Films of the German Empire
German silent feature films
Films directed by Uwe Jens Krafft
German thriller films
1910s thriller films
UFA GmbH films
German black-and-white films
Silent thriller films
1910s German films